Sporting club de Malesherbes is a French football club founded in 1957. Owned by Bernard Pougat, in the 2007-2008 season, they played in the championnat de France Amateurs 2 (D5).

History 

Champions of the Division d'Honneur of the Ligue du Centre de football, SC Malesherbes celebrated their fiftieth anniversary with a promotion to the national championships.

Honours 
Champion DH Centre : 2006-2007 ;
Winner of the Coupe du Loiret : 2002-2003 ;
Under 15s Champion of the Division d'Honneur Régionale Centre : 2001-2002 ;
Champion of the Promotion d'Honneur Centre Groupe A : 1999-2000.

Football clubs in France
Sport in Loiret
Association football clubs established in 1957
1957 establishments in France
Football clubs in Centre-Val de Loire